The women's team poomsae event at the 2018 Asian Games took place on 19 August 2018 at Jakarta Convention Center Plenary Hall, Jakarta, Indonesia.

Schedule
All times are Western Indonesia Time (UTC+07:00)

Squads

Results 
Legend
WO — Won by walkover

References

External links
Official website

Taekwondo at the 2018 Asian Games